USS Cod (SS/AGSS/IXSS-224) is a , the only vessel of the United States Navy to be named for the cod, an important and very popular food fish of the North Atlantic and North Pacific.

Cod is now a National Historic Landmark, preserved as a memorial and museum ship permanently moored in Cleveland, Ohio, and is open to visitors daily from 1 May to 30 September.

Construction and commissioning
Cod′s keel was laid down by the Electric Boat Company at Groton, Connecticut, on 21 July 1942. The submarine's five V16 diesel engines were built by General Motors Cleveland Diesel Plant on the west side of Cleveland, Ohio. She was launched on 21 March 1943, sponsored by Mrs. G. M. Mahoney, and commissioned on 21 June 1943 with Commander James C. Dempsey, USN; in command. Dempsey had already won fame by sinking the first Japanese destroyer lost in World War II while in command of the submarine .

World War II 

Cod suffered no damage or casualties in either incident.

First patrols, 1943 October – 1944 January
Cod arrived in Brisbane, Australia, on 2 October 1943 to prepare for her first war patrol. She sailed from there 20 days later. Penetrating the South China Sea, she contacted few targets, and launched an attack only once, on 29 November, with unobserved results. Returning to Fremantle, Australia, to refit from 16 December 1943 to 11 January 1944.

Second patrol, 1944 February – 1944 March
Cod put to sea for her second war patrol in the South China Sea, off Java, and off Halmahera. On 16 February, she surfaced to sink a sampan by gunfire, and on 23 February, torpedoed a Japanese merchantman. She sent another to the bottom on 27 February, Taisoku Maru (2,473 tons) and two days later attacked a third, only to be forced deep by a concentrated depth charging delivered by a Japanese escort ship.

Third patrol, 1944 March – 1944 June 
Refitting at Fremantle again from 13 March – 6 April 1944, Cod sailed to the Sulu Sea and the South China Sea off Luzon for her third war patrol. On 10 May, she attacked a heavily escorted convoy of 32 ships and sank the destroyer Karukaya and cargo merchantman Shohei Maru (7,256 tons) before the escorts drove her down with depth charges. Returning to Fremantle to replenish on 1 June 1944.

Fourth patrol, 1944 July – 1944 August
Cod was put to sea again 3 July on her fourth war patrol, under the command of Commander James "Silver Leader" Adkins. She ranged from the coast of Luzon to Java. She sank the converted net tender, Seiko Maru (708 tons) on 3 August, and a landing craft, LSV-129, on 14 August, and, once more successful, returned to Fremantle 25 August.

Fifth patrol, 1944 September – 1944 November 
Cod put to sea on her fifth war patrol 18 September 1944, bound for Philippine waters. She made her first contact, a cargo ship, Tatsushiro Maru (6,886 tons) on 5 October, and sank it. Two days later, she inflicted heavy damage on a tanker. Contacting a large convoy on 25 October, Cod launched several attacks without success. With all her torpedoes expended, she continued to shadow the convoy for another day to report its position. In November she took up a lifeguard station off Luzon, ready to rescue carrier pilots carrying out the series of air strikes on Japanese bases which paved the way for the invasion of Leyte later that month.

Cod returned to Pearl Harbor on 20 November 1944, and sailed on to a stateside overhaul at Mare Island Naval Shipyard, returning to Pearl Harbor on 7 March 1945.

Sixth patrol, 1945 March – 1945 May
On 24 March she sailed from Pearl Harbor for the East China Sea on her sixth war patrol. Assigned primarily to lifeguard duty, she used her deck gun to sink a tug and its tow on 17 April, rescuing three survivors, and on 24 April launched an attack on a convoy which resulted in the most severe depth charging of her career. The next day, she sent the minesweeper W-41 to the bottom. On 26 April Cod was threatened by a fire in the aft torpedo room, but the ship's crew brought the fire under control and manually launched a torpedo already in its tube before the fire could detonate it. QM2c L.E. Foley and S1c A.G. Johnson were washed overboard while freeing the torpedo room hatch. Foley was recovered the next morning, but Johnson was drowned during the night, the Cod's only fatality during the war.

Seventh patrol, 1945 May – 1946 June
After refitting at Guam between 29 May and 26 June 1945, Cod put out for the Gulf of Siam and the coast of Indo-China on her seventh war patrol under the command of Lieutenant commander Edwin M. Westbrook, Jr. On 9 and 10 July she went to the rescue of a grounded Dutch submarine, O-19, taking its crew on board and destroying the Dutch boat when it could not be gotten off the reef. This was the only international submarine-to-submarine rescue in history. After returning the Dutch sailors to Subic Bay, between 21 July and 1 August Cod made 20 gunfire attacks on the junks, motor sampans, and barges which were all that remained to supply the Japanese at Singapore. After inspecting each contact to rescue civilian crew, Cod sank it by gunfire and torpedoes, sending to the bottom a total of 23. On 1 August, an enemy plane strafed Cod, forcing her to dive, leaving one of her boarding parties behind.

When Cod returned to Fremantle 13 August 1945, the crew of O-19 was waiting to throw a party for their rescuers. During that celebration, the two crews learned of the Japanese surrender. To symbolize that moment, another symbol was added to Cods battle flag: the name O-19 under a martini glass.

Cod sailed for home on 31 August. Arriving in New London, Connecticut, on 3 November after a visit to Miami, Florida, Cod sailed to Philadelphia, Pennsylvania for overhaul, returning to New London where she was decommissioned and placed in reserve 22 June 1946.

Post-War service 1946 June – 1954 June 
Cod was mothballed in 1946, Cod was recommissioned in 1951 to participate in NATO anti-submarine training exercises under the command of Captain Francis E. Rich, USN. During the Cold War, Cod traveled to St. John's, Newfoundland, as well as Cuba and South America.

Great Lakes training vessel, 1954 June – 1971 December
Cod was decommissioned on 21 June 1954 and placed in reserve. In 1959 she was towed through the St. Lawrence Seaway to Cleveland, Ohio and was used as a training vessel. The Cod served as a training platform during the reservists' weekend drills. The Cod was reclassified first as an Auxiliary Submarine (AGSS-224) on 1 December 1962, and later as a Unclassified Miscellaneous Submarine (IXSS-224) on 30 June 1971. The Cod was in commission, but classed as "in commission in reserve". On 15 December 1971, the Cod was stricken from the Naval Vessel Register.

Awards and decorations
Cod is credited with sinking more than 12 enemy vessels totaling more than 37,000 tons, and damaging another 36,000 tons of enemy shipping. All seven of her war patrols were considered successful and Cod was awarded seven battle stars for her service in World War II, Cods battleflag and conning tower both carry a cocktail glass above the name O-19 to commemorate the rescue and the party.

 Museum ship and National Historic Landmark 

A group of Cleveland residents formed the Cleveland Coordinating Committee to Save Cod, Inc., with the goal of preserving the ship as a memorial. In 1976 January, the United States Navy gave guardianship of the submarine to the group. Cod opened for public tours as a floating memorial on 1 May 1976. In 1986, the U.S. Department of the Interior designated Cod a National Historic Landmark. The memorial is open daily between 1 May and 30 September of each year from 1000 to 1700 hours.

Today, Cod is one of the finest restored submarines on display and is the only U.S. submarine that has not had stairways and doors cut into her pressure hull for public access. Cod is the only World War II Fleet submarine that is still intact and in her wartime configuration. Visitors to the ship use the same vertical ladders and hatches that were used by her crew. She also has unique attractions such as the 5-inch deck gun that still can be rotated by visitors and mock-fired by Cods volunteer crew. The Cods Mark IV Torpedo Data Computer is also fully restored, as well as other various parts on the submarine.

Cleveland can claim partial credit as Cods birthplace, since the submarine's five diesel engines were built at the General Motors Cleveland Diesel Plant on Cleveland's west side. Cod acquired two General Motors Model 248 V16 engines  that had originally been used aboard another World War II submarine, . The engines were used for parts for the restoration of Cod engines. Four out of the five main engines on the Cod are in running and working order, and are fired up on special events throughout the year.

The Cod operates an amateur radio station, W8COD, and participates in various amateur radio contests and other events such as Field Day.

Normally, United States Navy submarines are dry-docked every five years while on active duty. If permanently moored in fresh water the maintenance interval can be extended to 25 years. On 30 September 2020 The USS Cod announced that they needed more donations so Cod can be sent to Donjon Shipbuilding & Repair in Erie, Pennsylvania for dry docking to repair and renew her underwater hull. The last time the Cod was in dry dock for repairs was in 1963 in Lorain, Ohio. Cod was closed to tours for approximately 60 days for a dry dock maintenance program that started 13 June 2021. The goal of the $1.4 million project is to conserve and restore the underwater hull of this 78 year old submarine so that she will continue to be a well-preserved National Historic Landmark and memorial for Naval veterans. Cod spent 63 days in Erie at Donjon Shipping & Repair.  Cod returned to Cleveland on 18 August 2021 to the 1201 North Marginal Road berth that she has occupied since her arrival in Cleveland in 1959. Cod'''s next dry docking project should happen in about eight to ten years.https://www.wkyc.com/article/news/local/cleveland/uss-cod-submarine-renovations/95-fdd0df39-f173-4457-95ee-abd6ebd5f457/ USS Cod undergoing $1.4 million renovations

Filming took place aboard the Cod in 2015. The series premiered Sunday 17 July 2016.Cod was the subject of a two-part documentary in the World of Warships YouTube channel named Naval Legends: USS Cod. The documentary published on 2 and 4 July 2019.Cod was used for exterior and interior scenes in the National Geographic war documentary WWII: Hell Under the Sea to depict World War II submarine action.Cod was used for exterior and interior scenes for the Dolph Lundgren motion picture Operation Seawolf to depict World War II German U-Boats. The motion picture released on 7 October 2022.

 References 
Citations

Bibliography

 Hinman, Charles R., and Douglas E. Campbell. The Submarine Has No Friends: Friendly Fire Incidents Involving U.S. Submarines During World War II. Syneca Research Group, Inc., 2019. .

 External links 

USS Cod Official Website
USS Cod Photo Archive
hazegray.org: USS Cod Dictionary of American Naval Fighting Ships
USS Cod Sail List
 Historic Naval ships Association
Video of USS Cod sinking O-19
USSCod on Hell Below Smithsonian Channel
Naval Legends: USS Cod part 1 World of Warships YouTube Documentary
Naval Legends: USS Cod part 2 World of Warships YouTube Documentary
[https://www.youtube.com/watch?v=e4162jE5L1s The USS Cods Lost Boarding Party] The Silent Service USS Cod'' Lost Boarding Party
USS Cod on WWII: Hell Under the Sea National Geographic
Operation Seawolf IMDb
Operation Seawolf Official Trailer YouTube

Gato-class submarines
World War II submarines of the United States
Cold War submarines of the United States
Submarines of the United States Navy
Naval museums in the United States
Ships built in Groton, Connecticut
1943 ships
Maritime incidents in August 1943
Friendly fire incidents of World War II
National Historic Landmarks in Ohio
Ships on the National Register of Historic Places in Ohio
National Register of Historic Places in Cleveland, Ohio
National Register of Historic Places in Cuyahoga County, Ohio
Military and war museums in Ohio
Museum ships in Ohio
Museums in Cleveland
History of Cleveland
Cleveland
Downtown Cleveland
Lake Erie